"One More Chance" is a song by the English electronic music duo Pet Shop Boys, first released as their second single in 1984 and re-recorded for their second album Actually in 1987. The track was originally credited to Neil Tennant and producer Bobby Orlando, before Chris Lowe wrote additional music for the album version.

Composition
"One More Chance" was based on an unused backing track Bobby Orlando had recorded for the actor/singer Divine, provisionally titled "Rock Me". Tennant then wrote a lyric for the song while in New York City, exploring themes of masochism and 'romantic paranoia'. Later, in 1987, the middle section was added ("You're so extreme / I want to take you home with me").

Releases
The Bobby Orlando production was released on 12-inch vinyl in the US by Bobcat Records; in Germany, Belgium and Canada by ZYX Records, ChanneL Records and Unidisc respectively; and on 7-inch vinyl in Sweden by Planet Records.

One of the two US singles included an early version of "West End Girls", later their breakthrough single in 1985. The Canadian release featured tracks by Girly and Divine.

The 1987 re-recording was produced by Julian Mendelsohn as a standard 7-inch single and album version. Pet Shop Boys were dissatisfied with the mix so Mendelsohn produced a 12-inch remix, which ultimately ended up on the album. The unused 7-inch mix was eventually released in 2001 on the second disc of Actually / Further Listening 1987–1988.

Track listings

United States 12-inch
"One More Chance" (Kordak Remix) – 3:26
"One More Chance" (Remix) – 5:33

United States two-song 12-inch
"One More Chance" – 3:26
"West End Girls" – 7:50

Belgian 12-inch
"One More Chance" (Remix) – 5:33
"One More Chance" – (3:26)

German 12-inch
"One More Chance" (Kordak Mix) – 3:26
"One More Chance" (Bobby O Remix) – 5:33

Swedish 7-inch
"One More Chance" – 3:30
"One More Chance" (Remix) – 5:37

Canadian 12-inch
"One More Chance" – 5:34
"Working Girl (One Way Love Affair)" (by Girly) – 5:10
"Love Reaction" (by Divine) – 5:31

German 1986 7-inch
"One More Chance" (Hurricane mix) – 3:25
"Theme for the Pet Shop Boys Pt II" – 3:40

German 1986 12-inch (reissued 1988 on 12-inch and MiniCD)
"One More Chance" (Hurricane mix) – 5:00
"Theme for the Pet Shop Boys Pt II" – 5:03

References

External links
 Comprehensive release/track listing from PSB-Catalogue.com

1984 singles
Pet Shop Boys songs
Songs written by Neil Tennant
Songs written by Chris Lowe
Song recordings produced by Julian Mendelsohn
1984 songs
Songs written by Bobby Orlando
Song recordings produced by Bobby Orlando
ZYX Music singles